Stjepan is a Croatian masculine given name, variant of Stephen, used by ijekavian speakers.

In Croatia, the name Stjepan was among the top ten most common masculine given names in the decades up to 1969.

Notable people with the name include:

 Stjepan Držislav of Croatia, Croatian monarch
 Stjepan II of Croatia, Croatian monarch
 Stjepan Svetoslavić, Croatian nobleman
 Stjepan Andrijašević, Croatian footballer
 Stjepan Babić, Croatian linguist
 Stjepan Babić (footballer), Croatian footballer
 Stjepan Bobek, Croatian footballer
 Stjepan Božić, Croatian boxer
 Stjepan Brodarić, Croatian cleric
 Stjepan Deverić, Croatian footballer
 Stjepan Damjanović, Croatian linguist
 Stjepan Đureković, Croatian businessman
 Stjepan Filipović, Croatian partisan
 Stjepan Gomboš, Croatian architect
 Stjepan Gradić, Croatian polymath
 Stjepan Hauser, Croatian cellist
 Stjepan Horvat, Croatian geodesist
 Stjepan Ivšić, Croatian linguist
 Stjepan Janić, Croatian canoer
 Stjepan Jukić, Croatian footballer
 Stjepan Kljuić, Bosnian Croat politician
 Stjepan Kovačević, Croatian politician
 Stjepan Lamza, Croatian footballer
 Stjepan Mesić, Croatian politician
 Stjepan Meštrović, Croatian-American sociologist
 Stjepan Mitrov Ljubiša, Serbian-Montenegrin politician
 Stjepan Mohorovičić, Croatian physicist
 Stjepan Musulin, Croatian linguist
 Stjepan Perestegi, Croatian canoer
 Stjepan Planić, Croatian architect
 Stjepan Poljak, Croatian footballer
 Stjepan Radić, Croatian politician
 Stjepan Sarkotić, Croatian soldier
 Stjepan Spevec, Croatian educator
 Stjepan Šejić, Croatian comic book artist
 Stjepan Šiber, Army of the Republic of Bosnia and Herzegovina of Croat origin
 Stjepan Šulek, Croatian composer
 Stjepan Tomas, Croatian footballer
 Stjepan Vrbančić, Croatian footballer
 Stjepan Vukčić Kosača, Bosnian nobleman

See also
 Stipan
 Stipe
 Stjepanović

References

Montenegrin masculine given names
Serbian masculine given names
Bosnian masculine given names
Macedonian masculine given names
Croatian masculine given names